The Forrest Group (also Groupe Forrest) is a group of companies founded around the mining industry in 1922. As of 2018, the Forrest Group is active primarily in Central and East Africa. It is owned by George Arthur Forrest, a Belgian entrepreneur of New Zealand descent.

Early history

Malta Forrest launched l'Entreprise Générale Malta Forrest (EGMF), a transport company, in 1922, in Katanga Province in the south of the Belgian Congo. In 1933, the company moved into mining gold, copper and manganese in the Kolwezi, Musonoi and Kasekelesa mines. In 1951, the company undertook the mining and civil engineering works to open the Kisenge manganese mine. In the early 1950s, it broadened out into public works and civil engineering, building the roads, sewerage system and airport for the mining city of Kolwezi. Around this time, the firm began to focus on civil engineering in the western Katanga copper belt.

Victor Eskenazi-Forrest, Malta Forrest’s adoptive son, helped his father to manage the company starting in 1954, and took over the company with George Arthur Forrest after the death of the founder. In 1968, the company took limited liability status. It was then involved in a series of large scale public works projects funded by international organizations such as the World Bank and the African Development Bank. Malta Forrest died in 1974, and Victor Eskenazi-Forrest and George Arthur Forrest, the founder's son, became Managing Directors. In 1986, after the death of Victor Eskenazi Forrest, George Arthur Forrest took full control.

The company undertook a major government contract to restore the road network in Lubumbashi, Likasi, Kolwezi and Kalemie.
In 1990 EGMF undertook a large strip mining work for the state-controlled mining company Gécamines.
In 1991 the country, now called Zaire, went through political upheaval and fell into a prolonged recession, bring the engineering works to a halt. 
In May 1995 EGMF helped fund Gécamines in mining the cobalt deposit of Kasombo 1, working as a private sector partner to the state-owned company.
George Forrest created the George Forrest International Group that year.

Later activities

The Forrest Group today includes "Malta Forrest", "George Forrest International S.A.", etc.  The companies consist of diverse industrial activities, including wind power energy, hydroelectric energy, mining & metallurgy, cement manufacturing, public works, civil engineering, biological food, aviation, and munitions manufacturing.

Controversy
In 2002, a United Nations panel named the George Forrest Group as one of 29 companies that should face sanctions for their operations in the Democratic Republic of the Congo.

In December 2010, WikiLeaks published cables that alleged showed that US officials were ignoring reports of dangerously high levels of radiation  at Forrest's Luiswishi Mine, and implied that uranium was being separated from the ore which purportedly held only copper and cobalt. Groupe Forrest International refuted these rumors, saying that although uranium was present in the copper and cobalt ore from the mine, it was at far too low a grade to be exploited, and radioactivity in the Luiswishi mine was largely lower than the European standards.

In 2009, Forrest invested in Korongo Airlines, together with Brussels Airlines and local investors, for flights between Lubumbashi and Kinshasa. The launch of other domestic services under the Forrest Group brand depended on upgrades to airport infrastructure.

References

Companies of Belgium
Mining companies of the Democratic Republic of the Congo